María Mercedes "Mechi" Margalot (born June 28, 1975 in Buenos Aires) is a retired field hockey player from Argentina, who won the silver medal with the national field hockey team at the 2000 Summer Olympics in Sydney.

Four years later, when Athens, Greece hosted The Games, she won the bronze medal with the Argentine squad. Mercedes also won the bronze medal at the 2008 Summer Olympics in Beijing, the World Cup in 2002, two Champions Trophy (2001, 2008), three medals at the Pan American Games (1999, 2003, 2007) and the Pan American Cup in 2001.

Margalot played club hockey in the Netherlands, first for Oranje Zwart of Eindhoven and then for Push of Breda.

External links
 
 

Argentine female field hockey players
Las Leonas players
Olympic field hockey players of Argentina
Field hockey players at the 2000 Summer Olympics
Field hockey players at the 2004 Summer Olympics
Field hockey players at the 2008 Summer Olympics
Olympic silver medalists for Argentina
Olympic bronze medalists for Argentina
Argentine people of French descent
Field hockey players from Buenos Aires
1975 births
Living people
Olympic medalists in field hockey
Medalists at the 2000 Summer Olympics
Medalists at the 2004 Summer Olympics
Medalists at the 2008 Summer Olympics
Pan American Games gold medalists for Argentina
Pan American Games medalists in field hockey
Field hockey players at the 1999 Pan American Games
Field hockey players at the 2003 Pan American Games
Field hockey players at the 2007 Pan American Games
Oranje Zwart players
Medalists at the 2007 Pan American Games
Medalists at the 1999 Pan American Games
Medalists at the 2003 Pan American Games
21st-century Argentine women